The 3rd Joe Fry Memorial Trophy was a non-championship Grand Prix held at the Castle Combe Circuit, Wiltshire on 28 August 1954. The race was won by Horace Gould in a Cooper T23, with Bill Whitehouse and John Riseley-Prichard second and third in their Connaughts. Bob Gerard set fastest lap in his 
Cooper.

Results

References

Joe Fry
Joe Fry